Ball of Fire is a 1941 American screwball comedy film directed by Howard Hawks and starring Gary Cooper and Barbara Stanwyck. This Samuel Goldwyn Productions film (originally distributed by RKO) concerns a group of professors laboring to write an encyclopedia and their encounter with a nightclub performer who provides her own unique knowledge.

The supporting cast includes Oscar Homolka, S. Z. Sakall, Henry Travers, Richard Haydn, Dana Andrews, and Dan Duryea. In 1948, Hawks recycled the plot for a musical film, A Song Is Born, this time starring Danny Kaye and Virginia Mayo. The film is also known as The Professor and the Burlesque Queen. In 2016, the film was deemed "culturally, historically, or aesthetically significant" by the United States Library of Congress, and selected for preservation in its National Film Registry.

Plot
A group of professors, all bachelors except for a widower, have lived together for some years in a New York City residence, compiling an encyclopedia of all human knowledge. The youngest, Professor Bertram Potts (Gary Cooper), is a grammarian who is researching modern American slang. The professors are accustomed to working in relative seclusion at a leisurely pace with a prim housekeeper, Miss Bragg, keeping watch over them. Their impatient financial backer, Miss Totten, suddenly demands that they finish their work soon.

Venturing out to do some independent research, Bertram becomes interested in the slang vocabulary of nightclub performer Katherine "Sugarpuss" O'Shea (Barbara Stanwyck). She is reluctant to assist him in his research until she suddenly needs a place to hide from the police, who want to question her about her boyfriend, mob boss Joe Lilac. Sugarpuss takes refuge in the house where the professors live and work, despite Bertram's objections and their housekeeper's threat to leave because of her. In the meantime, Joe decides to marry her, but only because as his wife she would not be able to testify against him.

The professors soon become enamored of her femininity, and she begins to grow fond of them. Sugarpuss teaches them to conga and demonstrates to Bertram the meaning of the phrase "yum yum" kisses. She becomes attracted to Bertram, who reciprocates by proposing marriage to her. She avoids giving him an answer to the proposal and agrees to Joe's plan to have the professors drive her to New Jersey to marry him. After a series of misadventures, including a car crash, Sugarpuss realizes that she is in love with Bertram, but is forced to go ahead with her marriage to Joe to save the professors from his henchmen. Bertram, meanwhile, unaware of Sugarpuss' love for him, prepares to resume his research, sadder but wiser, until he discovers her true feelings.

The professors eventually outwit Joe and his henchmen and rescue Sugarpuss. She claims she is not good enough for Bertram, but his forceful application of a kiss changes her mind.

Cast

Music

Martha Tilton provided Barbara Stanwyck's singing voice for the song "Drum Boogie". Drummer and bandleader Gene Krupa performed the song onscreen with his band. In an unusual twist, he also played it on a matchbox with matches for drumsticks. Krupa band member and noted trumpeter Roy Eldridge received a brief on-camera spot during "Drum Boogie". At one point, the professors also perform an a cappella version of the 1869 song "Sweet Genevieve".

Production
The script was written by Charles Brackett, Thomas Monroe, and Billy Wilder from a short story titled "From A to Z", which Wilder had created while he was still in Europe. Partly inspired by the fairy tale "Snow White", the professors were loosely based on the dwarfs from Walt Disney's animated film Snow White and the Seven Dwarfs. Although Ball of Fire was directed by the well-established Howard Hawks, Wilder had already decided that he needed to direct his screenplays to protect them from studio and other directors' interference. Hawks was happy to let Wilder study his directing on the set and Wilder thereafter directed his own films. The film was the second feature of 1941 to pair Cooper and Stanwyck, following Meet John Doe.

Ginger Rogers and Carole Lombard turned down the Sugarpuss role, while Lucille Ball was almost cast until Gary Cooper recommended Stanwyck.

Wilder reveled in poking fun at those who took politics too seriously. At one point, Sugarpuss points to her sore throat and complains "Slight rosiness? It's as red as the Daily Worker [a left-wing newspaper] and just as sore."

Wilder also worked in a reference to Cooper's Oscar-winning performance in the title role of Hawks' 1941 film Sergeant York by having Dan Duryea's character Duke Pastrami say, "I saw me a movie last week" before licking his thumb and rubbing it on the sight of his gun, a technique Cooper's York uses to improve his marksmanship.

Reception
According to RKO records, Ball of Fire took in $1,856,000 in theater rentals from the United States and Canada and an additional $785,000 from foreign rentals, but because of the terms of Sam Goldwyn's deal with RKO, RKO recorded a loss of $147,000 on it.

Ball of Fire holds a 100% approval rating on Rotten Tomatoes based on 26 reviews, with a weighted average of 8.24/10. The site's consensus reads: "A splendidly funny twist on the story of Snow White, Ball of Fire boasts a pair of perfect leads in Gary Cooper and Barbara Stanwyck".

Awards and honors

Ball of Fire was nominated for Academy Awards for Best Actress in a Leading Role (Barbara Stanwyck), Best Music, Scoring of a Dramatic Picture, Best Sound, Recording (Thomas T. Moulton) and Best Story.

In World War II, a total of 12 servicemen were pen-pals with Stanwyck; two of them asked for a poster of her in the Ball of Fire outfit for their mess hall.

Ball of Fire is recognized by American Film Institute in these lists:
 2000: AFI's 100 Years...100 Laughs – #92
 2002: AFI's 100 Years...100 Passions – Nominated
 2005: AFI's 100 Years...100 Movie Quotes:
 Sugarpuss O'Shea: "I love him because he's the kind of guy who gets drunk on a glass of buttermilk, and I love the way he blushes right up over his ears. I love him because he doesn't know how to kiss, the jerk!" – Nominated
 2008: AFI's 10 Top 10:
 Romantic Comedy Film – Nominated

In a 1999 AFI poll, stars Gary Cooper and Barbara Stanwyck were both ranked #11 on the male and female lists of the greatest American screen legends.

References

Notes

Bibliography

 
 Jewell, Richard B. RKO Radio Pictures: A Titan Is Born.  Berkeley, California: University of California Press, 2012. .
 Madsen, Axel. Stanwyck: A Biography. New York: HarperCollins, 1994. .
 Smith, Ella. Starring Miss Barbara Stanwyck. New York: Random House. 1995. .
 Thomson, David. Gary Cooper (Great Stars). New York: Faber & Faber, 2010. .
 Wayne, Jane. Life and Loves of Barbara Stanwyck. London: JR Books Ltd., 2009. .

External links

 
 
 
 
 Ball of Fire on Screen Guild Theater: November 30, 1942
 Ball of Fire on Theater of Romance: January 23, 1945

1941 films
1941 romantic comedy films
1940s screwball comedy films
American crime comedy films
American romantic comedy films
American screwball comedy films
American black-and-white films
1940s English-language films
Films scored by Alfred Newman
Films directed by Howard Hawks
Films set in New York City
RKO Pictures films
Samuel Goldwyn Productions films
Films with screenplays by Billy Wilder
Films with screenplays by Charles Brackett
United States National Film Registry films
Films based on short fiction
Films about lexicography
1940s American films